Vincent Daly (1948 – 26 May 2021) was an Irish Gaelic football player who played for club side St. Mary's, Granard and at inter-county level with the Longford senior football team.

Career

Daly was a member of a footballing family associated with St. Mary's Granard club, stretching back to the 1930's and beyond. Daly's own career started with a win in the schools' championship in 1960. Further championship medals followed at juvenile and underage levels before he was selected to play on the Longford minor team in 1966. Daly won a County Championship title before he reached the highlight of his career when he captained the Longford senior team to their only Leinster Championship title in 1968.

Honours

St Mary's, Granard
Longford Senior Football Championship: 1967, 1970
Longford Under-21 Football Championship: 1966, 1967, 1968

Longford
Leinster Senior Football Championship: 1968 (c)

References

1948 births
2021 deaths
Longford inter-county Gaelic footballers